Frank Seymour Wright (December 26, 1878 – February 13, 1931) was an American sport shooter who competed in the 1920 Summer Olympics.

In 1920 he won the gold medal as member of the American team in the team clay pigeons competition and the bronze medal in the individual trap event. He was born in South Wales, New York.

References

External links
Frank Wright's profile at databaseOlympics
Frank Wright at US Trapshooting Hall of Fame

1878 births
1931 deaths
American male sport shooters
Shooters at the 1920 Summer Olympics
Olympic gold medalists for the United States in shooting
Olympic bronze medalists for the United States in shooting
Trap and double trap shooters
Medalists at the 1920 Summer Olympics